Rickenbacker International Airport  is a civil-military public airport  south of downtown Columbus, near Lockbourne in southern Franklin County, Ohio, United States. The south end of the airport extends into Pickaway County. The base was named for flying ace and Columbus native Eddie Rickenbacker. It is managed by the Columbus Regional Airport Authority, which also operates John Glenn Columbus International Airport and Bolton Field. Rickenbacker International is primarily a cargo airport for the city of Columbus, although since 2012 it has served an increasing number of passenger flights as well as charter carriers.

The United States Air Force maintains a presence in the form of the Ohio Air National Guard's 121st Air Refueling Wing, Rickenbacker International is also home of the Ohio Army National Guard's Army Aviation Support Facility No. 2 and the headquarters for the Ohio Military Reserve, one of the state defense forces of Ohio.

History
The facility opened in June 1942 as Lockbourne Army Airfield (named after the nearby village of Lockbourne). It was then named the Northeastern Training Center of the Army Air Corps, and provided basic pilot training and military support. In addition, the training center provided B-17 flight training to the Women Airforce Service Pilots (WASPs), and training for glider pilots in the CG-4A Waco glider. After the war, flight-training activities were halted and the airfield was used as a development and testing facility for all-weather military flight operations. The primary unit at the base was the all-Black 447th Composite Group, also known as the Tuskegee Airmen.

During the Cold War the facility was Lockbourne Air Force Base and was assigned to the USAF Strategic Air Command. Lockbourne AFB was redesignated Rickenbacker Air Force Base on May 18, 1974, by Department of the Air Force Special Order GA-11 of March 6, 1974, to honor Columbus native Eddie Rickenbacker, the leading American fighter pilot of World War I.

The base was transferred from the Strategic Air Command (SAC) to the Air National Guard and redesignated Rickenbacker Air National Guard Base on April 1, 1980.

The base was recommended for closure by the 1991 Base Realignment and Closure Commission, but as a result of a proposal by the State of Ohio, the 1993 Commission recommended that Rickenbacker ANGB be realigned rather than closed. The Commission decided to retain the 121st Air Refueling Wing and the 160th Air Refueling Group of the Ohio Air National Guard in a military cantonment area at Rickenbacker ANGB instead of realigning to Wright-Patterson AFB. The Air National Guard would continue to operate as tenants of the Rickenbacker Port Authority (RPA) on the RPA's airport and the military facilities were realigned as Rickenbacker Air National Guard Station on September 30, 1994, by the 1991 Congressional Base Realignment and Closure Commission.

In August 2001 construction started on a new, consolidated Navy and Marine Corps Air Reserve Center at Rickenbacker International Airport. The $10 million center, scheduled for completion in early 2003, will be located at the intersection of 2nd Avenue and Club Street adjacent to the Air National Guard facility at Rickenbacker. Being developed by the Navy Reserve, the project will consolidate the Naval Air Reserve Center at Rickenbacker with the Navy and Marine Corps Reserve Center currently located on Yearling Road in Columbus. When completed, the nearly 1,000 Navy and Marine Corps reservists currently located at the two existing reserve centers will shift their activities to this new facility. Once the new center opens, the site of the existing Naval Air Reserve Center at Rickenbacker will be redeveloped by the Columbus Regional Airport Authority, which operates the  airport.

Due to the COVID-19 pandemic, airlines such as Emirates, Korean Air, and Etihad have serviced the airport with passenger aircraft converted to transport loose cargo while demand for air travel wanes and freight continues to rise. On April 1, 2021, Rickenbacker and the CRAA celebrated the 500th arrival of a converted passenger plane: Emirates flight 2501 from Copenhagen.

Operations
Rickenbacker was run by the Rickenbacker Port Authority, until merging in 2003 with Port Columbus and Bolton field creating the Columbus Regional Airport Authority. As of July 2006, Rickenbacker is the world's 126th busiest cargo airport according to Air Cargo World. Rickenbacker ranks as one of the world's top 20 fastest growing cargo airports in July 2006 with 112,888 tons, a 15.3% increase from the previous year. This is mainly due to the transfer of AirNet Systems operations from Port Columbus International Airport to Rickenbacker. This number is expected to increase with the introduction of the new intermodal facility that is under construction. As of now it has scheduled service from FedEx Express along with FedEx Feeder contractors, Mountain Air Cargo and CSA Air and UPS Airlines along with contractors Air Cargo Carriers. Multi-weekly 747 freighter service is operated by Atlas Air and Kalitta Air. Another airline based at Rickenbacker is Snow Aviation.

Rickenbacker International Airport was also the site for filming all aircraft exterior shots in the movie Air Force One starring Harrison Ford while also acting as Ramstein Air Base in the film. In 2007, Rickenbacker hosted the Gathering of Mustangs and Legends air show, one of the largest-ever gatherings of operable classic warbirds, especially the P-51 Mustang.

Facilities and aircraft

 Runway 05R/23L: , surface: asphalt/concrete
 Runway 05L/23R: , surface: asphalt

In the year ending December 31, 2018 the airport had 23,575 aircraft operations, average 65 per day: 60% air carrier, 24% military and 16% general aviation. 32 aircraft at the time were based at the airport: 4 single engine and 28 military aircraft.

In December 2006 PlanetSpace entered negotiations with the Ohio government to build a spaceport at Rickenbacker. The company has since been dissolved by the Government of Canada.

Also in 2006, the Columbus Regional Airport Authority completed a noise compatibility study for the airport. This program helps to guide suggested flight paths and targets soundproofing of buildings exposed to high levels of aircraft noise.

AirNet Express headquarters is at the airport.

In 2008, Norfolk Southern opened the Rickenbacker Intermodal Terminal adjacent to the airport. This facility allows the handling of approximately 250,000 Intermodal containers annually and anchors Norfolk Southern's Heartland Corridor. The project allows easy access to and from the deep water port at Norfolk, Virginia via the use of double stack containers as well as improved access to rail hubs in the Chicago area.

Airlines and destinations
Since the completion of the current passenger terminal in 2003, Rickenbacker has acted as a secondary airport for Columbus and the airport has seen a number of carriers come and go, including Southeast Airlines, Boston-Maine Airways, Hooters Air, Direct Air, USA3000 Airlines, Fly Mission Air and Vision Airlines. In 2012, low-cost carrier Allegiant Air launched service to Sanford and St. Petersburg, FL and has since been successful in expanding service to ten additional leisure destinations in the Southern United States.

Multiple major cargo airlines, including a number of international ones, also operate at Rickenbacker International Airport.

Passenger

Cargo

Statistics

Top destinations

Motor racing
In 1953 and 1954 the airport was used for two meetings organised by the Sports Car Club of America.

See also

 Central Air Defense Force (Air Defense Command)
 121st Air Refueling Wing

References

External links
 
 

 Historical Photos
Air show at Rickenbacker A.F.B. in 1974
Fighter jet with control tower in background, 1974
Captain Eddie Rickenbacker, the base's namesake, in 1958

Airports in Ohio
Airports established in 1942
Buildings and structures in Columbus, Ohio
Transportation buildings and structures in Franklin County, Ohio
Buildings and structures in Pickaway County, Ohio
Transportation in Columbus, Ohio
1942 establishments in Ohio